The medial root of median nerve is one of the two sources of the median nerve, the other being the lateral root of median nerve.

References

Nerves of the upper limb